"Joan of Arc" is a 1981 song by English electronic band Orchestral Manoeuvres in the Dark (OMD), released as the second single from their third studio album Architecture & Morality. It was well-received by critics and became an international hit, reaching the Top 5 in the UK and Canada and number 13 in Ireland.

This is the first of two OMD songs written by lead vocalist Andy McCluskey on the subject of the French saint Joan of Arc. The second, "Joan of Arc (Maid of Orleans)" was also issued as a single (renamed "Maid of Orleans (The Waltz Joan of Arc)" for its release). Both tracks feature on Architecture & Morality.

Reception
"Joan of Arc" met with a positive critical response; on 26 November, Smash Hits journalist Ian Cranna ranked the track no. 1 in a list of his "current listening pleasure". Sunie Fletcher of Record Mirror felt the song has a "tender mood" and is "not particularly striking on first hearing", but allowed that it may be a "grower" akin to previous single "Souvenir". In a retrospective review, AllMusic's Ned Raggett described the track as "a towering heartbreaker, with Andy McCluskey and band in full flight". Critic Dave Thompson observed a "revelation of a single" with a "gorgeous melody", adding that "the power of this song is almost equal to Joan's own". Trouser Press called the track a "magnificent, ethereal hit".

Music journalist Paul Roland listed "Joan of Arc" as one of his "100 Essential Singles"; the track was voted the 71st-best of 1981 in a Slicing Up Eyeballs reader poll. The Charlatans vocalist Tim Burgess wrote, "For anyone who wasn't around in 1981 you could not go anywhere without hearing this song... such a classic." He noted that seeing "Joan of Arc" played on the chart television show, Top of the Pops, "was so romantic".

B-side
The B-side to the single was a new track entitled "The Romance of the Telescope (Unfinished)". The song was later remixed and featured on Dazzle Ships (1983), without the "unfinished" caveat. The B-side version was included on remastered re-issues of Architecture & Morality in 2003 and 2007. "The Romance of the Telescope" has been performed on several occasions since 1981 when it was usually played as a concert opener, although more recently as a final song on live set lists.

Track listings

7" vinyl single
 UK: DinDisc DIN 36
Side one
 "Joan of Arc" (McCluskey)
Side two
 "The Romance of the Telescope (Unfinished)" (Humphreys/McCluskey)

12" vinyl single
 UK: DinDisc DIN 36-12
 "Joan of Arc" (McCluskey)
Side two
 "The Romance of the Telescope (Unfinished)" (Humphreys/McCluskey)

Track timings were not stated on vinyl releases.

Single cover photograph
The cover of the single depicting a statue of Joan of Arc is thought to be the same statue that was present in the National Trust Gardens at Cliveden in Buckinghamshire. In 1980/81, this statue could be found among the trees in the Ilex Grove at Cliveden.

Charts

Certifications

Live performances
The song has been performed at live shows on a regular basis since the Architecture & Morality tour in 1981. A live performance from 1981 was filmed for the Live at The Theatre Royal, Drury Lane concert in December 1981, initially released on VHS (1982) and laserdisc (1984)  and later on DVD 

Live recordings have been made available on the "Walking on the Milky Way" CD single (1996), the Architecture & Morality & More album (2008), and on Architecture & Morality / Dazzle Ships – Live at the Royal Albert Hall (2016). The song was also performed with The Royal Liverpool Philharmonic Orchestra in June 2009 as documented by the Electricity DVD release.

References

1981 singles
Orchestral Manoeuvres in the Dark songs
Songs based on actual events
Songs written by Andy McCluskey
1981 songs
Songs about Joan of Arc